Harry Victor Jaffa (October 7, 1918 – January 10, 2015) was an American political philosopher, historian, columnist, and professor. He was a professor emeritus at Claremont McKenna College and Claremont Graduate University, and a distinguished fellow of the Claremont Institute. Robert P. Kraynak says his "life work was to develop an American application of Leo Strauss's revival of natural-right philosophy against the relativism and nihilism of our times".

Jaffa wrote on topics ranging from Aristotle and Thomas Aquinas to Abraham Lincoln, Winston Churchill, and natural law. He has been published in the Claremont Review of Books, the Review of Politics, National Review, and the New York Times. His most famous work, Crisis of the House Divided: An Interpretation of the Issues in the Lincoln-Douglas Debates, written in 1959, has been described as "the greatest Lincoln book ever".

Jaffa was a formative influence on the American conservative movement, challenging notable conservative thinkers, including Russell Kirk, Richard M. Weaver, and Willmoore Kendall, on Abraham Lincoln and the founding of the United States. He debated Robert Bork on American constitutionalism. He died in 2015.

Early life and education

Jaffa was born in New York City on October 7, 1918, to Arthur Solomon Jaffa and Frances Landau Jaffa; his middle name is a reference to World War I, which ended with the same year he was born. His family was Jewish. He earned a Bachelor of Arts degree in English literature from Yale University and a Doctor of Philosophy (PhD) degree in political philosophy from The New School for Social Research. As a PhD student, he became interested in Abraham Lincoln after discovering a copy of the Lincoln–Douglas debates in a used bookshop.

Jaffa was one of Leo Strauss' first PhD students. His dissertation on Aristotle and Thomas Aquinas later became his first book, Thomism and Aristotelianism. There, he argues that the Christian beliefs of Aquinas influenced Aquinas' work on Aristotle. Alasdair MacIntyre describes the book as "an unduly neglected minor modern classic."

Career
Jaffa taught at Ohio State from 1951 through 1964, before moving to Claremont.

Founding of the United States
Jaffa believed the American founders, including Thomas Jefferson, James Madison, and George Washington established the nation on political principles traceable from Locke to Aristotle. While he believed that governments are instituted to protect rights, he acknowledged the higher ends they serve, primarily happiness. The Declaration of Independence says

Jaffa points out that safety and happiness are the principal virtues of Aristotelian political life in his Politics. Jaffa also points to Federalist No. 43, in which James Madison declares that safety and happiness are the aims of all political institutions, and George Washington's first inaugural address as cementing the link between human happiness and government and therefore the ancient roots of the American founding.

Abraham Lincoln scholarship
Jaffa wrote two books dealing exclusively with Abraham Lincoln.  His first, Crisis of the House Divided: An Interpretation of the Issues in the Lincoln-Douglas Debates, was written in 1959. Forty years later, he followed it with A New Birth of Freedom: Abraham Lincoln and the Coming of the Civil War.  Jaffa has also written a number of essays on Lincoln for the Claremont Institute, National Review, and other scholarly journals.  Before Jaffa, most conservative scholars, including M. E. Bradford, Russell Kirk, and Willmoore Kendall believed that Lincoln's presidency represented a substantial growth in federal power and limitation on individual rights.

Jaffa also believed that the Declaration of Independence and the Constitution share a relationship whereby the latter is intended to preserve the principles of the former. This belief has garnered criticism from legal scholars, particularly Robert Bork.

Crisis of the House Divided

In Crisis of the House Divided, Jaffa discusses the Lincoln–Douglas debates that occurred on the eve of the American Civil War. During the 1850s, concern over the spread of slavery into the territories and into the free states became the primary concern of American politics. Stephen A. Douglas proposed the doctrine of popular sovereignty, which removed congressional authority over slavery's expansion into the territories and allowed the citizens of each territory to decide whether or not slavery would be legal there. In contrast, Lincoln believed that popular sovereignty was another example of tyranny of the majority. Lincoln argued that a majority could not sanction the enslavement of other men due to the Founding principle that "All men are created equal," which slavery violated. Both men squared off in a contest for Illinois' Senate seat in 1858.

In the book, Jaffa explains the philosophical underpinnings of both Lincoln and Douglas' arguments. According to Catherine H. Zuckert, Jaffa "aimed at nothing less than bringing to bear on America the methods and substance of the Straussian revival of the Socratic tradition of political philosophy." Like Strauss, Jaffa observed the tendency of modernity to degenerate moral and political philosophy, which he found in Douglas' appeal to popular sovereignty. Jaffa also believed that Lincoln challenged Douglas' argument with an Aristotelian or classical philosophical position derived from the Declaration of Independence and its contention that "all men are created equal."

A New Birth of Freedom
A New Birth of Freedom was to be the first of a projected two-volume commentary on the Gettysburg Address. The first volume focuses on Lincoln's First Inaugural Address and his July 4, 1861, address to Congress. Jaffa argues that the Gettysburg Address is not a self-contained work but "a speech within a drama. It can no more be interpreted apart from the drama than, let us say, a speech by Hamlet or MacBeth can be interpreted apart from Hamlet or MacBeth.  The Gettysburg Address is a speech within the tragedy of the Civil War, even as Lincoln is its tragic hero. The Civil War is itself an outcome of tragic flaws—birthmarks, so to speak—of the infant nation."

Jaffa describes human equality as America's "ancient faith" and contends that the Declaration of Independence reflects the principles of natural law.  According to Jaffa, Lincoln's task was to restore America's political faith, saving the Union from the historicism of the Confederacy. Jaffa considers the political philosophy of John C. Calhoun the backbone of the Confederacy's new constitution and its notion of human inequality. According to him, Calhoun believed that equality was only a prescriptive attribute on the part of the states, not a natural right of human persons. By extension, Calhoun believes that human equality is derived from the relationship between equal states and not equal persons. Jaffa therefore believes that Calhoun's understanding of equality differs greatly from the American founders.

Debating Lincoln

Jaffa has debated many conservative and libertarian critics of Abraham Lincoln. In the mid-1960s, he argued for Lincoln's conservative legacy in the pages of National Review with Frank Meyer, who maintained that Lincoln opened the door to unlimited expansion of federal power. In his book, Storm Over the Constitution (1999), he formulated a theory of constitutional law, incorporating the Declaration of Independence. The theory was criticized for being overly philosophical, rather than legal, despite being presented as a legal argument. His approach was especially  critical of figures such as William Rehnquist and Robert Bork, who responded to Jaffa in National Review.

Jaffa has also criticized the scholarship of other prominent conservatives including Russell Kirk, Richard Weaver, M.E. Bradford, and Willmoore Kendall. Most recently, Jaffa debated libertarian author Thomas DiLorenzo.

Debate with Thomas DiLorenzo
Jaffa and Thomas DiLorenzo debated each other on May 7, 2002, in an event hosted by the Independent Institute. Each man made a statement followed by a rebuttal by the other, ending with questions and answers from the audience.

Jaffa's argument was divided into four sections:
 The South Was a Closed Society: For the 1860 Presidential Election, in 10 of the 11 states that became the Confederate States, Lincoln was not on the ballot, denying him at least the 100,000 votes of those who later went north to join the Union Army, possibly more. Jaffa points out that in the Cooper Union Address, Lincoln concluded that the South would be satisfied only if all anti-slavery sentiment was removed from the state constitutions in the eight free states that had laws preventing free blacks from being kidnapped as slaves. The man accused of being a slave could summon no witnesses, and had no counsel. Jaffa said that "if the federal commissioner decided he was a slave, he [the commissioner] was paid $10, and if he decided he was a free man, he was paid $5. It's hard to imagine any law passed in either Nazi Germany or Stalin's Russia that was more inconsistent with the principles of civil liberty than the Fugitive Slave Act."
 The Right of Secession Is Not the Right of Revolution: Jaffa distinguished revolution from secession. Revolution, he argues, is explained under the Declaration of Independence. It states, "Whenever any form of government becomes destructive of these ends [the security of life, liberty, and the pursuit of happiness], the people have a right to alter or abolish it, and to institute new government [such] as to them shall seem most likely to effect their safety and happiness." In contrast, the Confederacy claimed the right of secession, as the Confederacy believed that such a right existed under the Constitution. Jaffa argues that the Confederacy claimed secession instead of revolution because its rights were not being violated by the federal government. However, he also notes that the states that ratified the Constitution also agreed to adhere to the results of all elections and that by seceding from the Union, the Confederacy violated this basic promise.
 Prelude to Southern Secession: Jaffa believed that the initial act of secession took place at the 1860 Democratic Convention. According to him, the seven states of the Deep South, the same seven states that seceded after Lincoln's election and before his inauguration, demanded as a plank in the Democratic platform, without which they would not support Douglas, a slave code for the territories.  When the Convention refused to grant this demand, the delegates of the seven states left the convention. In this section of the debate, Jaffa points out that slavery was aggressively expanding with the repeal of the Missouri Compromise by the Kansas–Nebraska Act. Also, the Dred Scott case allowed slave owners to take slaves into the territories and demand Federal government protection for slavery in those areas. Jaffa claims that this was one of the largest expansions of federal power.
 The Lincoln–Douglas Debates: Jaffa argued that Douglas accepted the Dred Scott decision. There, Chief Justice Taney said that the right to own slaves is expressly affirmed in the Constitution. However, Lincoln said in the debates that it was implied but not expressly affirmed. Lincoln said to Douglas that by accepting Taney's opinion that slavery is expressly affirmed in the Constitution, one is under an obligation to give the slave owners the implementation of this right. The possibilities for the expansion of slavery were almost endless, according to Jaffa. Because Douglas would not subscribe to the slave code, the South left the party, which was enough to elect Abraham Lincoln.

Criticism of Robert Bork
Jaffa argues that former Supreme Court nominee Robert Bork advances a theory of American constitutionalism that is in fundamental tension with the principles of the Declaration of Independence, and that was insufficiently conservative. Jaffa argued that Bork's argument represents legal positivism and moral relativism akin to that expressed by John C. Calhoun and the Confederacy during the Civil War.  According to Jaffa, Bork believed that the Constitution and the Declaration are separate documents that were never intended to inform one another. Bork argued that the Constitution said nothing about abortion or gay rights. Jaffa believed that the Constitution followed natural law principles, and therefore prohibited states from protecting abortion or homosexuality. Bork replied that Jaffa's theories amounted to "the heart's desire theory of constitutional jurisprudence: Anything one does not like is in the Constitution", and that those who agreed with him "had much in common with Harry Blackmun, although neither would care to admit it."

National Review

Jaffa was close friends with William F. Buckley, publishing a number of articles on Lincoln in National Review throughout his career. He credits Buckley with allowing him to publish when he had been blacklisted by liberal journals and neoconservative publications after a dispute with Irving Kristol.  However, Jaffa disagreed with many of the writers then publishing for the magazine including Russell Kirk and Frank Meyer. According to him, these men and other writers there rejected the principles of the Declaration of Independence and its main contention that "all men are created equal." Jaffa spent his lifetime stressing the importance of the Declaration to conservatives and liberals alike.

Barry Goldwater campaign
During the 1964 presidential campaign, Jaffa, who was serving as a speechwriter to Republican candidate Barry Goldwater, penned the line, "Extremism in the defense of liberty is no vice, and moderation in the pursuit of justice is not a virtue" in his acceptance speech for the Republican presidential nomination.  Although Goldwater claimed repeatedly that the line originated in a speech by Cicero, it appears nowhere in Cicero's works, and was in fact authored by Jaffa.

Death
Jaffa died at Pomona Valley Hospital on January 10, 2015, the same day as his fellow Straussian and rival Walter Berns.

Personal life
Jaffa married Marjorie Butler in 1942; she died in 2010. They had three children, Donald, Philip, and Karen.

Bibliography

Books
 Thomism and Aristotelianism: A Study of the Commentary by Thomas Aquinas on the Nicomachean Ethics (Chicago: University of Chicago Press, 1952).
 Crisis of the House Divided: An Interpretation of the Issues in the Lincoln-Douglas Debates, (Chicago: University of Chicago Press, 1959).
 How to Think about the American Revolution: A Bicentennial Cerebration (Carolina Academic Press, 1978).
 Original Intent & the Framers of the Constitution, (Washington, D.C.: Regnery Publishing, Inc., 1994).
 Shakespeare's Politics, ed. by Harry V. Jaffa and Allan Bloom (Chicago: University of Chicago Press, 1996).
 Storm Over the Constitution, (Lanham: Lexington Books, 1999).
 A New Birth of Freedom, (Lanham: Rowman & Littlefield Publishers, Inc., 2000).
 The Rediscovery of America (Rowman & Littlefield, 2019)

Articles
 "The Ends of History Means the End of Freedom" January 17, 1990.
 "Clarifying Homosexuality and Natural Law" January 1, 1991.
 "A Review of Richard Mohr's Book" February 1, 1991.
 "A Reply to Philip Dynia" August 19, 1993.
 "Defending the Cause of Human Freedom" April 15, 1994.
 "Defending the Cause of Human Freedom" April 15, 1994.
 "The Party of Lincoln vs. The Party of Bureaucrats" September 13, 1996.
 "How Lincoln Foresaw the End of Slavery" January 29, 1998.
 "Leo Strauss, the Bible, and Political Philosophy" February 13, 1998.
 "The False Prophets of American Conservatism" February 12, 1998.
 "The Deepening Crisis" February 9, 1999.
 "Why Special Interests and the Constitution are Good For You" February 20, 2000.
 "Thoughts on Lincoln's Birthday" January 22, 2001.
 "Campaign Reform is Unconstitutional No Matter What McCain May Claim" February 1, 2001.
 "Aristotle and Locke in the American Founding" February 10, 2001.
 "American Conservatism and the Present Crisis" February 12, 2003.
 "Strauss at 100" May 14, 2003.
 "Can There Be Another Winston Churchill?" February 6, 2004.
 "Never Before In History", July 2, 2004.
 "Ignoble Liars and Noble Truth-Tellers", August 17, 2004.
 "Wages of Sin", October 11, 2004.
 "The Logic of the Colorblind Constitution", December 6, 2004.
 "Jaffa on Intelligent Design", January 3, 2006.
 "The Disputed Question", January 9, 2007.
 "The American Founding as the Best Regime", July 4, 2007.
 "Macbeth and the Moral Universe", February 19, 2008.
 "The Soul of Buckley", April 4, 2008.
 "God Bless America, "Claremont Review of Books," Spring 2008.
 "The Speech That Changed the World", February 6, 2009.
 "Lincoln In Peoria", Fall 2009.
 "Aristotle and the Higher Good" July 1, 2011.

References

Further reading
 Knopff, Rainer.  "Walter Berns (1919-2015) and Harry Jaffa (1918-2015): A Canadian's Appreciation." (2015)

External links

 Writings of Harry V. Jaffa at the Claremont Institute
 
 

1918 births
2015 deaths
American historians
American people of Polish-Jewish descent
American political philosophers
Jewish American historians
California Republicans
Claremont McKenna College faculty
Political scientists who studied under Leo Strauss
New Right (United States)
Historians of Abraham Lincoln